Poggio Santa Maria  is a frazione of L'Aquila in the same-named province in the Abruzzo region of Italy.

Frazioni of L'Aquila